By-elections are held in Zambia when seats of the National Assembly are vacated, or any elected public office becomes vacant.

List

References